Sudarshan Thapa is an actor in Nepali films. He started his career in the Nepali film industry as a director of the hit movie Mero Euta Saathi Chha - a remake of Korean movie Millionaire's First Love, produced by Prabhu Shumsher Jung Bahadur Rana in 2009. His first directorial was a blockbuster that set a new trend for the industry. Since then, there was no turning back and his filmography grew with movies like "Ke yo Maya Ho", "Mero Love Story", "Dhanda", etc. He is basically known for his romantic movies with strong emotional factor.  Apart from directing, he also established himself as an actor in the movie "Saathi", Ajhai Pani, "Chankhe Shankhe Pankhe", etc.

Personal life 
Thapa was born in Kathmandu on 6 September 1979. He completed diploma in film industry before joining the film industry.

Career 
Sudarshan Thapa started his reel career from television series. He was a lead actor in ‘Dalan’ series in 2062, which was broadcast on Nepal television and as a director in ‘houseful’ series, which was broadcast in Kantipur television. His debut directorial venture from featured film Mero Euta Saathi Chha.

Movies

References 

Nepalese male film actors
1979 births
Living people
Actors from Kathmandu
21st-century Nepalese film directors
Nepalese film directors